Judy Collins Sings Leonard Cohen: Democracy is an album by Judy Collins, released in 2004. It collected songs written by Leonard Cohen (or in the case of "Song of Bernadette", co-written with Jennifer Warnes and Bill Elliott) from Collins' previous albums, as well as four previously unreleased recordings.

Track listing
 "Democracy" – 6:55 (new recording)
 "Suzanne" – 4:23 (from In My Life, 1966)
 "A Thousand Kisses Deep" – 5:42 (new recording)
 "Hey, That's No Way to Say Goodbye" – 3:34 (from Wildflowers, 1967)
 "Dress Rehearsal Rag" – 5:23 (from In My Life, 1966)
 "Priests" – 4:58 (from Wildflowers, 1967)
 "Night Comes On" – 4:03 (new recording)
 "Sisters of Mercy – 2:34 (from Wildflowers, 1967)
 "Story of Isaac" – 3:33 (from Who Knows Where the Time Goes, 1968)
 "Bird on a Wire" – 4:40 (from Who Knows Where the Time Goes, 1968)
 "Famous Blue Raincoat" – 5:37 (from Living, 1971)
 "Joan of Arc" – 5:57 (from Living, 1971)
 "Take This Longing" – 5:26 (from Bread and Roses, 1976)
 "Song of Bernadette" – 4:13 (previously unreleased live recording from 1999)

2004 albums
Judy Collins compilation albums
Elektra Records albums
Leonard Cohen tribute albums